Chandrabhan Singh Chaudhary is an Indian politician and a former member of Madhya Pradesh Legislative Assembly. He was elected to the assembly from Chhindwara as a candidate of Bharatiya Janata Party in 2013. He passed B.com in 1980 and L.L.B in 1983 from Dr. Hari Singh Gour University. He has contested 1991, 1996 and 2014  Lok Sabha election from Chhindwara against Kamal Nath, a minister and was defeated. In 1996, he faced Kamal Nath's wife Alka Nath.

References

Living people
National Democratic Alliance candidates in the 2014 Indian general election
Madhya Pradesh MLAs 2013–2018
People from Chhindwara
Year of birth missing (living people)
Bharatiya Janata Party politicians from Madhya Pradesh